Pottinger Street is a street in Central, Hong Kong. It is also known as the Stone Slabs Street since the street is paved unevenly by granite stone steps. It was named in 1858 after Henry Pottinger, the first Governor of Hong Kong, serving from 1843 to 1844. It is a Grade I historic building.

Location

The street was originally on the slope between Queen's Road Central and Hollywood Road. This section is entirely covered by stone slabs. It then crosses Stanley Street and Wellington Street and ends at the western end of Hollywood Road, just after it meets Wyndham Street.

Central District underwent several reclamation projects, and extended the street north from Queen's Road Central to Connaught Road Central, junctioning Des Voeux Road Central. Buildings like Man Yee Building, Wing On House, Chinachem Tower and Hong Kong Chinese Bank Building are located at this section. This is the only section that allows vehicular traffic and not being paved by stone slabs.

History
The first Roman Catholic cathedral of Hong Kong was built in 1843 at the junction of Pottinger Street and Wellington Street and was destroyed in a fire in 1859. It was rebuilt, but subsequently a different site was selected and the current Cathedral of the Immaculate Conception at Caine Road was completed 1888.

In the 19th century, Chinese and European residents used to live separately in different neighbourhoods. The street once acts as a rough boundary between the two groups. The Chinese used to mainly live west of the street and westerners to the east. An Air-Raid Precaution Tunnel was built beneath the street in 1940-41 but was abandoned after the Second World War and was filled back in the 1980s.

In the afternoon of 15 December 1941, during the Battle of Hong Kong, a stick Japanese bombs hit the junction of Old Bailey Street and Caine Road, the junction of Pottinger Street and Hollywood Road, Wellington Street and the Central Police Station. The bombing was part of a systematic bombardment of the Hong Kong Island's north shore that was launched on that day.

See also
 List of streets and roads in Hong Kong

References

External links

 Article at gwulo.com
 

Central, Hong Kong
Grade I historic buildings in Hong Kong
Ladder streets in Hong Kong
Street markets in Hong Kong
Roads on Hong Kong Island